Dragan Škrbić (born 29 September 1968) is a Serbian former handball player. He was named the 2000 IHF World Player of the Year.

Club career
Over the course of his career that spanned over two decades, Škrbić played for Jugović, Crvena zvezda (1988–1993), Atlético Madrid (1993–1994), Alzira (1994–1995), Ademar León (1995–1997), VfL Hameln (1997–1998), Celje (1998–2000), HSG Nordhorn (2000–2002) and Barcelona (2002–2007). He won the EHF Champions League with Barcelona in the 2004–05 season.

International career
At international level, Škrbić represented FR Yugoslavia in eight major tournaments, winning two bronze medals at the World Championships (1999 and 2001) and one bronze at the European Championships (1996). He also participated in the 2000 Summer Olympics.

Honours
Celje
 Slovenian First League: 1998–99, 1999–2000
 Slovenian Cup: 1998–99, 1999–2000
Barcelona
 Liga ASOBAL: 2002–03, 2005–06
 Copa del Rey: 2003–04, 2006–07
 Supercopa ASOBAL: 2003–04, 2006–07
 EHF Champions League: 2004–05
 EHF Cup: 2002–03

References

External links
 
 
 

1968 births
Living people
People from Kula, Serbia
Serbian male handball players
Yugoslav male handball players
Competitors at the 1991 Mediterranean Games
Mediterranean Games medalists in handball
Mediterranean Games gold medalists for Yugoslavia
Olympic handball players of Yugoslavia
Handball players at the 2000 Summer Olympics
RK Jugović players
RK Crvena zvezda players
CB Ademar León players
FC Barcelona Handbol players
Liga ASOBAL players
Handball-Bundesliga players
Expatriate handball players
Serbia and Montenegro expatriate sportspeople in Spain
Serbia and Montenegro expatriate sportspeople in Germany
Serbia and Montenegro expatriate sportspeople in Slovenia
Competitors at the 1990 Goodwill Games
Goodwill Games medalists in handball